Rudraveena  (referring to the instrument of the same name) is a 1988 Indian Telugu-language musical-drama film written and directed by K. Balachander. Produced by Nagendra Babu Anjana Productions, the film stars Chiranjeevi and Shobana alongside Tamil actor Gemini Ganesan which marked one of his rare appearances in Telugu films. It also marked the acting debut of Kannada actor and filmmaker Ramesh Aravind in Telugu cinema. P. L. Narayana, Prasad Babu, Sumithra, Devilalitha, and Brahmanandam play supporting roles.

Rudraveena focuses on the ideological conflicts between 'Bilahari' Ganapathi Sastry, a reputed carnatic musician and his younger son Suryanarayana "Suryam" Sastry. Sastry's discrimination towards the people belonging to lower castes is criticised by his son, Suryam, who believes in society's welfare and walks out for good later. The events that led to the change in Sastry's views form the remaining part of the story. Ganesh Patro wrote the film's dialogue and worked on the script with Balachander for two months, though it was tweaked many times during the shoot. Ilaiyaraaja composed the soundtrack and background score. R. Raghunadha Reddy was the director of photography. Ganesh Kumar edited the film and Mohanam was the art director.

Filmed in and around Chennai, Kanchipuram, Courtallam, and Srinagar for 70 days, Rudraveena was produced on a budget of 80 lakh. Released on 4 March 1988 to critical acclaim, the film was a commercial failure, resulting in a loss of 60 lakh. It gained cult status later and is considered one of the best films made by Balachander. The film won three National Film Awards: Best Feature Film on National Integration, Best Music Direction, and Best Male Playback Singer (for S. P. Balasubrahmanyam). It also won four Nandi Awards, including a Special Jury award for Chiranjeevi. Later the same year, Balachander later remade the film into Tamil as Unnal Mudiyum Thambi with Ganesan reprising his role, and Kamal Haasan reprising Chiranjeevi's role.

Plot 
Satyanarayana, an aged MP, visits Ramapuram. After talking to the locals, Satyanarayana finds that Ramapuram is well-developed and civilised due to the activities of a man named Suryam. He meets Suryam and asks him what inspired him to take up the task of developing Ramapuram. After learning of Satyanarayana interest in Ramapuram's development, Suryam agrees to relate the village's story in the parliament.

Suryanarayana "Suryam" Sastry is the son of 'Bilahari' Ganapathi Sastry, a reputed carnatic music maestro. Sastry is short tempered and discriminates against people based on their caste. Suryam has an elder brother, Udayam, who was born mute and is adept at playing the nadaswaram. He also has a younger sister Sandhya, who plays the tambura. Suryam and Sastry have ideological differences, as the former prefers to help the needy instead of practicing music. Udayam's wife, Gayathri, keeps mediating between the two, which strengthens her bond with Suryam. After watching a dancer performing on a cliff away from a temple, Suryam meets her and learns that she is Lalitha Sivajyothi, a classical dancer who belongs to a lower caste and is denied entry into the temple. Her father Varalayya, a lawyer by profession, is a social worker and is successful to an extent. On the other hand, an amateur singer named Charukesa follows Sandhya and befriends her. Encouraged by Gayathri, Suryam proposes to Lalitha and is successful.

On his way back to home to join Sastry for a concert, Suryam helps a few victims of an accidental fire in Ramapuram. His absence leaves Sastry livid and he refuses to listen to any excuses. Sastry comes across Suryam and Lalitha as a couple, which widens the gap between them. While Gayathri is apprehensive, Udayam remains unaffected. On the way to another concert, Sastry refuses to help an injured lineman named Narayana. A disturbed Suryam emphasises that society's welfare is more important than worshipping music, which makes Sastry declare Charukesa his successor as a musician. Suryam confronts Sastry about this and leaves the house for good after an argument. Suryam meets Varalayya and stays in his client's house. Suryam later meets Narayana's widow and learns that the government has denied him compensation as he was drunk during working hours. He also meets the family of another drunkard named Kishtappa, one of the survivors of the fire. Their situation leaves Suryam disturbed, and he vows to abolish liquor in Ramapuram. Suryam and Lalitha begin their attempts to make the working-class men abandon liquor consumption. Although initially successful, the plan backfires later.

Sastry finds that Charukesa and Sandhya are in a relationship, and humiliates the former. After Sandhya's rebellion, Sastry conducts their marriage. After the event, Sastry asks Charukesa to request any gift as dowry. Keeping the past in mind, Charukesa asks Sastry to abandon the Bilahari raga he specialised in as a musician at his future concerts. Sastry agrees half-heartedly and Suryam, who attends the marriage, performs a concert to a positive response. Varalayya plans to conduct the marriage of Suryam and Lalitha, and informs Sastry of this. At Sastry's instigation, a group of drunkards create a ruckus at the venue. They promise to give up drinking if Suryam walks out of the marriage. With Lalitha's consent, Suryam calls off his wedding. His sacrifice earns the respect of the villagers, and the drunkards obey his words. An agitated Udayam and Gayathri leave Sastry's house after learning of his deception. Suryam and Lalitha start a rural development movement named "Lalitha Grameena Sveeyasikshana Udyamam" and achieve the desired results.

Satyanarayana is pleased to learn that twenty-eight villages adopted Suryam's methods and achieved successful development. He also quits consuming alcohol. Suryam gains national recognition for his work and the prime minister announces a felicitation in Ramapuram. Except for Sastry, all of Suryam's family members, including Charukesa, attend the event. Initially reluctant, Sastry arrives shortly after and introduces himself proudly as Suryam's father instead of as a prominent carnatic musician. He also approves Suryam's marriage with Lalitha, much to the happiness of the villagers.

Cast 
 Chiranjeevi as Suryanarayana "Suryam" Sastry
 Gemini Ganesan as 'Bilahari' Ganapati Sastry
 Shobana as Lalitha Sivajyoti
 P. L. Narayana as Varalayya
 Prasad Babu as Udayam
 Sumithra as Gayathri
 Ramesh Aravind as Charukesa
 Devilalitha as Sandhya
 Brahmanandam as a Kishtappa
 Kaikala Satyanarayana as Satyanarayana (cameo appearance)

Production

Development 
Chiranjeevi wanted his brother Nagendra Babu to work in films after graduating from college. To gain experience in film production, Babu worked at the Geetha Arts company. He started a company named Anjana Productions after his mother K. Anjana Devi. He planned to make an unconventional film without considering Chiranjeevi's on-screen image as an action hero. After watching Sankarabharanam (1980) and Sindhu Bhairavi (1985), Babu approached Chiranjeevi's mentor K. Balachander to direct his maiden production venture. They worked together on Idi Katha Kaadu (1979) and 47 Rojulu (1981); Chiranjeevi played the antagonist in both films. Balachander agreed to direct the film; he chose the concept of national integration and rural development after watching Anna Hazare developing Ralegan Siddhi, a village in Maharashtra. He was also inspired by a retired Indian Administrative Service (IAS) officer's act of adopting his village in West Godavari district.

Balachander approached his favourite screenwriter Ganesh Patro to write the dialogues; Patro was credited for giving a native appeal to Balachander's successful Telugu films. Despite finding the concept obsolete, Patro silently completed the bound script in two months. According to Patro, Balachander tweaked the film's script many times during the shoot. They planned to name the film Bilahari after the Carnatic raga of the same name, but changed it to Rudraveena to reflect the characters' anger, equating it to that of the Hindu god Shiva.

Casting 
Shobana was chosen as the female lead; her experience as a dancer helped the film. After considering many options, Tamil actor Gemini Ganesan was finalised to play Chiranjeevi's father. This was one of the actor's rare appearances in Telugu cinema. Ganesan played 'Bilahari' Ganapathi Sastry, a reputed carnatic musician specialising in songs composed using Bilahari raga. S. P. Balasubrahmanyam dubbed Ganesan's dialogue portions as well as providing vocals as a playback singer. Rudraveena marked the Telugu cinema debut of Ramesh Aravind, another of Balachander's protégés. P. L. Narayana, Prasad Babu, Sumithra, Devilalitha, and Brahmanandam played supporting roles. Kaikala Satyanarayana made a cameo appearance.

Ilaiyaraaja was signed to compose the film's soundtrack and background score. R. Raghunadha Reddy was the film's director of photography. Ganesh Kumar edited the film and Mohanam was the art director. Filmmaker Bapu designed the logo of the production company and the film's title. The role written for Narayana was a last minute addition by Balachander; he took inspiration from similar characters in English plays and ballads he had read.

Filming 
Rudraveena principal photography took place at Chennai, Kanchipuram, Coutrallam, and Srinagar for 70 days. Balachander later remarked, "Chiranjeevi has both Kamal Haasan and Rajnikanth in him. Not only can he do action, he can also act".

Music 

Ilaiyaraaja composed the film's soundtrack and background score. Sirivennela Sitaramasastri was approached to write the lyrics for the songs after his work in K. Viswanath Sirivennela (1986) was noticed. Sitaramasastri penned the lyrics for twelve songs, out of which nine songs form part of the soundtrack. According to Patro, Balachander wanted the songs to convey the story rather than serving the protagonists' dreams; the makers used verses from the poetry anthology Maha Prasthanam, written by Telugu writer Sri Sri, in the song "Cheppalani Vundi".

Rudraveena is considered one of the acclaimed works of Ilaiyaraaja in Telugu cinema. K. Naresh Kumar of The Hans India commented that K. J. Yesudas and K. S. Chithra bring the song "Lalitha Priya Kamalam" to life "soothingly", adding that everything is right about the number in terms of instrumentation. Pulagam Chinnarayana of Sakshi praised Ilaiyaraaja's varied instrumentation in the re-recording and found Sitaramasastri's lyrics "optimistic and poetic". At the presentation of the Sri Raja-Lakshmi award in November 2006, Balasubrahmanyam performed the song "Taralirada" at Kalabharathi auditorium, Visakhapatnam.

The Music Rights of the film were acquired by Aditya Music.

Track list

Release 
Rudraveena was produced on a budget of 80 lakh. Released on 4 March 1988, the film received critical acclaim. It was also premiered at the 12th International Film Festival of India. However, it was a commercial failure and Babu had to incur a loss of 60 lakh. It was dubbed as a setback for Chiranjeevi who had starred in a streak of successful films such as Pasivadi Pranam, Swayamkrushi, Jebu Donga (all released in 1987) and Manchi Donga (1988). Babu considered Rudraveena a spiritually awakening film personally and felt that a book could be written about it. The film was remade into Tamil as Unnal Mudiyum Thambi in the same year by Balachander himself, with Kamal Haasan reprising Chiranjeevi's role, while Ganesan reprised his role.

Critical reception 
The retrospective reviews for the film were positive. In their Encyclopedia of Indian Cinema, Ashish Rajadhyaksha and Paul Willemen termed Rudraveena a reformist film for Chiranjeevi which aimed to achieve "greater critical respectability" for the actor by "addressing caste in a calculated effort". Suresh Krishnamoorthy of The Hindu commented that Rudraveena showcased Chiranjeevi in a different light compared to Marana Mrudangam, a successful mainstream film by the actor released in the same year. Mihir Fadnavis of Daily News and Analysis termed Chiranjeevi's performance in Rudraveena "possibly his best ever".

Pulagam Chinnarayana, writing for Sakshi, called Rudraveena a sugarcoated and non-preachy take on the harsh realities of 1980s Indian society by Balachander. K. Naresh Kumar of The Hans India praised Raghunadha Reddy's cinematography: "Reddy provides perfect eye-candy for the discerning visual lovers, packing in multi-dimensional images of the Shaivite abodes of God, preserved wonderfully over time". C. V. Aravind of the Deccan Herald stated that Balachander extracted an excellent performance from Chiranjeevi. He compared the film with other Telugu films such as Subhalekha (1982), Swayamkrushi and Aapadbandhavudu (1992) where Chiranjeevi was cast in "well-defined" character roles that "contrasted sharply with his image as a commercial entertainer".

Awards 
At the 36th National Film Awards, Rudraveena won in three categories: Nargis Dutt Award for Best Feature Film on National Integration, Best Music Direction, and Best Male Playback Singer (Balasubrahmanyam). With this, it became the only Telugu film after Saptapadi (1981) to receive the Nargis Dutt award. It was also Ilaiyaraaja's third award after Sagara Sangamam (1983) and Sindhu Bhairavi. Sitaramasastri lost the Best Lyricist award with a difference of one vote.

Nandi Awards - 1988
Best Dialogue Writer - Ganesh Patro 
Best Music Director - Ilaiyaraaja
Best Audiographer - Pandurangam
Special Jury Award - Nagendra Babu

Legacy 
Rudraveena is considered one of the cult films in the careers of Balachander and Shobana. In an interview with Rediff.com in April 1997, Chiranjeevi stated that he opted to act in Rudraveena for an image makeover. He added that despite its failure, the film made him happy as it had inspired many villages in Andhra Pradesh. During his tenure as the president of India, A. P. J. Abdul Kalam visited Chiranjeevi's Eye & Blood Bank (CEBB) in June 2006 and expressed his appreciation for the initiative; the actor recalled the day when he ruled out the climax of Rudraveena ever happening in real life.

Hindustan Times included Rudraveena in their 2015 list of 10 memorable films directed by Balachander. On Chiranjeevi's 60th birthday, Indo-Asian News Service included the film in their list of underrated performances by the actor. Koratala Siva Srimanthudu (2015) starring Mahesh Babu and Shruti Haasan was compared with Rudraveena for its similarities on a thematic level (rural development and father-son conflict). Commenting on the same, Babu stated that Srimanthudu was more mainstream and commercial than realistic in its approach.

References

External links 
 

1980s Telugu-language films
1980s musical drama films
1988 films
Best Film on National Integration National Film Award winners
Films about alcoholism
Films about social issues in India
Films about the caste system in India
Films directed by K. Balachander
Indian musical drama films
Films with screenplays by K. Balachander
Films scored by Ilaiyaraaja
Telugu films remade in other languages
1988 drama films